is a private women's junior college in Sakai, Osaka, Japan. The precursor of the school was founded in 1922, and it was chartered as a university in 1965.

External links 
  

Private universities and colleges in Japan
Educational institutions established in 1922
Universities and colleges in Osaka Prefecture
Japanese junior colleges
1922 establishments in Japan
Sakai, Osaka